Major League Baseball Delivery Man Award may refer to:

 Major League Baseball Delivery Man of the Month Award
 Major League Baseball Delivery Man of the Year Award